Rock Mill is a  Grade II listed smock mill at Washington, West Sussex, England, which has been converted to residential use.

History
Rock Mill was built in 1823. The mill was working at the outbreak of the First World War but was converted to a house in about 1919, using the machinery as decoration. The composer John Ireland bought the mill in 1953 and died there in 1962. As of 2007, the mill is used as offices.

Description

Rock Mill is a three-storey smock mill on a single-storey base, formerly carrying a beehive cap winded by a fantail. It had four Patent sails and drove three pairs of millstones (two pairs French Burr and one pair of Peak stones).

Millers
Thomas Harwood, 1837
Henry Harwood, 1837-40
E. Mitchell, 1845-55
S.A. Coote, 1890

References

External links
Windmill World webpage on Rock Mill.

Windmills in West Sussex
Smock mills in England
Grade II listed buildings in West Sussex
Windmills completed in 1823
Octagonal buildings in the United Kingdom
Grade II listed windmills